Clarene Law (born July 22, 1933) is an American politician who served in the Wyoming House of Representatives from the 23rd district from 1991 to 2005.

References

1933 births
Living people
Republican Party members of the Wyoming House of Representatives
20th-century American politicians
21st-century American politicians